Saddle Peak or Saddle Hill is located on North Andaman Island in India's Andaman and Nicobar Islands. At 732 m, it is the highest point of the archipelago in the Bay of Bengal. 

The peak is located close to the east coast. It is surrounded by Saddle Peak National Park. It is located to the south of  Diglipur and to the southwest of Kalipur Beach. A scenic viewpoint, Mehendi Tikrey View Point, is located just to the east of the peak, and a reservoir, Kalpong Dam, is located just to the peak's west.

References

Mountains of the Andaman and Nicobar Islands
Highest points of Indian states and union territories
North Andaman Island